Phoebis agarithe, the large orange sulphur, is a butterfly in the  family Pieridae. It is found from Peru north to southern Texas and peninsular Florida. Rare strays can be found up to Colorado, South Dakota, Wisconsin, and New Jersey. The species has also been introduced in Hawaii. The habitat consists of open, tropical lowlands including gardens, pastures, road edges, trails and parks.

The upper surface of the males is bright orange without markings. There are two female forms, a pink-white and yellow-orange form. The underside of the forewings of both sexes has a straight submarginal line. There are two seasonal forms: the winter form has heavier underside markings. Adults are on wing from August to September in southern Texas and all year round in the tropics. They feed on flower nectar, favoring lantana, shepherd's needle, bougainvillea, rose periwinkle, Turk's cap and hibiscus.

The larvae feed on fresh leaves of Pithecellobium and Inga species.

Subspecies
The following subspecies are recognised:
Phoebis agarithe agarithe (Texas, Mexico)
Phoebis agarithe fischeri (H. Edwards, 1883) (Baja California)
Phoebis agarithe maxima (Neumoegen, 1891) (Florida)
Phoebis agarithe antillia Brown, 1929 (Haiti)
Phoebis agarithe pupillata Dillon, 1947 (Dominica)
Phoebis agarithe tumbesina Lamas, 1981 (Peru)

References

Coliadinae
Butterflies of North America
Butterflies of Central America
Butterflies of the Caribbean
Pieridae of South America
Lepidoptera of Brazil
Fauna of the Amazon
Butterflies described in 1836
Taxa named by Jean Baptiste Boisduval